Enyalioides touzeti, also known as Touzet's woodlizard, is a species of lizard in the family Hoplocercidae. It occurs on the western Andean slopes of southwestern Ecuador and northern Peru.

References

Enyalioides
Lizards of South America
Reptiles of Ecuador
Reptiles of Peru
Reptiles described in 2008
Taxa named by Ana de Lourdes Almendáriz Cabeza
Taxa named by Omar Torres-Carvajal